Upside Down: The Best of The Jesus and Mary Chain is a greatest hits album by Scottish alternative rock band, the Jesus and Mary Chain. It was released on 27 September 2010 via Music Club Deluxe.

The album contains various key tracks from the band's discography, including their singles and a number of rare B-sides, alternative versions and live cuts. Rare songs featured in the albums include the band's reunion song, "All Things Must Pass", which was recorded for the television series "Heroes" in 2008, an alternative version of "33 1/3", "45 RPM", which appeared on 104.9: An XFM Compilation Album and a re-recording of "The Hardest Walk", which originally appeared on the soundtrack of "Some Kind Of Wonderful".

Reception

Andy Kellman of AllMusic gave the album a positive review, stating: "Upside Down might seem like too much for casual fans, but it retails for the price of a single disc and functions as a thorough, accurate representation of the band’s discography." PJ Meiklem of The Skinny wrote: "The evolution between 1984’s debut single Upside Down and All Things Must Pass (the only new material released since reforming in 2007) may be clear, but it’s not so marked as to drag you through a 44-song-journey to chart it."

Julian Marszalek of The Quietus praised the album, commenting: "Splendidly mastered to boost the fuzz that fizzes throughout the Jesus and Mary Chain’s three chord gems, Upside Down… is a great introduction for anyone seeking an alternative to received wisdom erroneously taken as fact, as well as a timely reminder of Reidian greatness for any lapsed apostles." Johnny Dee of Classic Rock magazine also wrote: "unchronological, Upside Down doesn’t tell the story of The Mary Chain’s transformation from Creation Records agent provocateurs to gothic pop stars to rock’n’roll class act. Instead it darts between eras and demonstrates the breadth of their career."

Robert Spellman of Daily Express described the album as "a useful 44-track gathering of JAMC material spanning the Reid brothers' recording output from 1984 to 2008."

Track listing

Personnel 
The Jesus and Mary Chain
 Jim Reid - vocals, guitar, production
 William Reid - vocals, guitar, production

References

External links
 Upside Down: The Best of The Jesus and Mary Chain on Demon Music Groups

2010 greatest hits albums
The Jesus and Mary Chain compilation albums